Surcoufia is a genus of horse flies in the family Tabanidae.

Species
Surcoufia paradoxa Kröber, 1922

References

Brachycera genera
Tabanidae
Diptera of Asia
Taxa named by Otto Kröber